Rudolf Joachim Seck (15 July 1908 – 1974) was an SS-Oberscharführer (staff sergeant) during World War II during the course of which he committed a large numbers of crimes against humanity, for which he was later sentenced to serve life in prison by a West German court.

Activities during World War II 

Seck held the SS ranks of Unterscharführer and later Oberscharführer (staff sergeant). He was the commander of Jungfernhof concentration camp, near Riga, Latvia. His office was at the Gestapo headquarters in Riga on Reimerstrasse.

According to Joseph Berman, a Jewish man from Ventspils and a survivor of The Holocaust in Latvia, who was assigned to the work detail cleaning Seck's automobile, Seck was closely associated with Rudolf Lange, the main SS leader in occupied Latvia. Seck made it a habit to meet, at the Šķirotava Railway Station, trains of Jews deported from Germany, Austria, or Czechoslovakia. Theoretically these Jews were to be sent to the Riga Ghetto or the Jungfernhof or Salaspils concentration camps, but usually this did not occur, as Seck would instead take them to Biķernieki or Rumbula forests, near Riga, and shoot them.

Seck also traveled about Latvia, the Baltic states and Belarus with Nazi convoys to fight partisans or liquidate various camps and ghettos. The Gestapo maintained a clothing depot in Riga, on Peterholm Street, where the belongings of murdered Jews would be collected. Seck was seen at the clothing depot appropriating for himself suitcases of new clothing and jewelry. Seck personally beat and maltreated prisoners on a regular basis.

Seck was responsible for selecting between 1600 and 1700 Jews from among the Jungfernhof concentration camp inmates to be transported, on 26 March 1942, to the Biķernieki forest to be murdered in what became known as the Dünamünde Action.

Convicted of crimes against humanity 
Following the war, Seck was tried in West Germany before the Landsgericht Hamburg with other Nazi personnel who planned or participated in the murder of Jews in Latvia. In 1951, Seck was convicted and sentenced to life in prison. Among his crimes were his personal murder of eight Jews, including seven in Jungfernhof. The court described these murders as follows:

References

Sources
 Berman, Josef, Affidavit dated 16 February 1949 (3 pages), Wiener Library on-line collections
  Meyer, Beate, Die Verfolgung und Ermordung der Hamburger Juden 1933-1945; Geschichte, Zeugnis, Erinnerung (The Persecution and Murder of the Jews of Hamburg 1933-1945: History, Testimony, Memory) Institut für die Geschichte der Deutschen Juden, Wallstein Verlag GmbH Hamburg 2006 
  Schneider, Gertrude, Journey into terror: story of the Riga Ghetto, (2d Ed.) Westport, Conn. : Praeger, 2001 
  Justiz und NS-Verbrechen: Die Deutschen Strafverfahren wegen NS-Tötungsverbrechen (Justice and Nazi Crimes: The German criminal prosecution of Nazi homicidal offenses), University of Amsterdam  On-line database of West German and East German prosecutions.  Chiefly in German but with significant portions in the English language.

External links

Holocaust perpetrators in Latvia
Holocaust perpetrators in Lithuania
1908 births
1974 deaths
Nazis convicted of war crimes
Holocaust perpetrators in Belarus
SS non-commissioned officers
Jungfernhof concentration camp
Kaiserwald concentration camp personnel
German prisoners sentenced to life imprisonment
People from Dithmarschen